Kirkconnell or Kirkconnel may refer to:

 Kirkconnel, a town in Scotland
 Kirkconnel railway station, a mainline railway station in Kirkconnel, Scotland
 Kirkconnell Correctional Centre, a prison in New South Wales, Australia
 Moses Kirkconnell, Caymanian politician
 Watson Kirkconnell (1895–1977), Canadian scholar, university administrator and translator